The women's high jump event at the 2021 European Athletics Indoor Championships was held on 5 March at 19:13 (qualification) and 7 March at 17:45 (final) local time.

Medalists

Records

Results

Qualification
Qualification: Qualifying performance 1.91 (Q) or at least 8 best performers (q) advance to the Final.

Final

References

2021 European Athletics Indoor Championships
High jump at the European Athletics Indoor Championships
European